Tjaš Begić (born 30 June 2003) is a Slovenian professional footballer who plays as an attacking midfielder for Serie C Group A club Vicenza and the Slovenian under-21 national team.

Club career 

Begić started playing football at Izola, before moving to Koper. In 2018, he joined Gorica, where he progressed through the youth ranks and was promoted to the first team in 2020. He subsequently made his professional debut on 8 March 2020, at 16 years and 9 months, coming in as a substitute for Victor Aliaga in the second half of the second division match against Dob, which ended in a 2–0 loss for his team. He then made his first start on 30 August 2020, as he also scored his first senior goal in a 5–0 win against Triglav Kranj, which made Gorica win the promotional play-off and gain promotion back to the national top tier.

After one more season with Gorica in the PrvaLiga, where he scored three goals and made two assists in 28 matches, Begić joined Celje on a permanent deal in the summer of 2021. At Celje, Begić established himself as a regular starter, amassing a total amount of 37 appearances between the league and the national cup during the 2021–22 campaign.

On 5 July 2022, Begić officially joined Serie C side Vicenza on a permanent deal, signing a four-year contract with the club. On 22 January 2023, he scored his first goal for the Italian club, finding the net in a 3–0 league win against AlbinoLeffe.

International career 

Begić has represented Slovenia at various youth international levels.

Although he received his first call-up to the under-21 national team in May 2021, he didn't made his official competitive debut with the squad until 6 September of the same year, during the match against Andorra. He went on to take part in several matches of the European Under-21 Championship qualifiers, which ultimately saw Slovenia fail to progress to the final stage.

Career statistics

Club

References

External links 

2003 births
Living people
Slovenian footballers
Slovenia youth international footballers
Slovenia under-21 international footballers
Slovenian expatriate footballers
Association football midfielders
Slovenian Second League players
Slovenian PrvaLiga players
Serie C players
ND Gorica players
NK Celje players
L.R. Vicenza players
Slovenian expatriate sportspeople in Italy
Expatriate footballers in Italy